Table Rock Reservation was a short-lived Indian reservation north of the Rogue River in Oregon, United States. It was established by treaty with the Rogue River Indians in 1853.  Following the conclusion of the Rogue River Wars in 1856, the Native American inhabitants were moved to other reservations.  The reservation was in Southern Oregon, between Upper Table Rock and Evans Creek.

History
Conflicts between miners and Rogue River Indians began in the early 1850s, when gold was discovered in what is now Oregon.  This conflict turned into open warfare and several treaties were signed in an attempt to end the hostilities resulting in the Native Americans ceding their land.  They were moved to Table Rock Reservation before being moved to the Grand Ronde Reservation and the Coast Reservation (a small fraction of which is now the Siletz Reservation).

Native Americans lost most of the Bear Creek Valley in exchange for the Table Rock Reservation.  In October 1855, a lack of food, a cold winter, and disease devastated the families on the reservation, so a group of Takelma Indians returned to their old village at the mouth of Little Butte Creek on the upper Rogue River.  A volunteer militia then attacked them, killing 23 including women and children.  A small group responded to this dire situation by fleeing to the Rogue River Canyon, attacking miners and settlers from Evans Creek to Galice Creek on the way.  The militia and regular army troops caught up with them in the Grave Creek Hills, and the Indians inflicted heavy casualties on the poorly trained troops.  What became known as the Battle of Hungry Hill was a major victory for the Indians.  In November, the militia and army again attacked, and again were defeated.  The attack was meant to be a surprise, but the Native Americans heard them chopping trees to build rafts and were prepared.

Several more battles were then fought.  In the spring of 1856, a force of nearly 200 volunteers arrived at the mouth of Ditch Creek on the Rogue River, and fired on the Indians' settlement on the far shore.  Up to 30 Indians were killed during the day-long assault, forcing the survivors to surrender.  In the summer and following winter, licensed hunters killed and captured Indians who remained in the area.

The survivors of the Battle of Hungry Hill were loaded onto a steamboat at Port Orford, Oregon then transported via the Columbia River and Willamette River and then overland to the Siletz Reservation near the Oregon Coast.

See also 
 Upper and Lower Table Rock

References

External links
1853 News Article, The Treaty for Sale of Lands from the Oregon Historical Society
The Fort Lane Archaeology Project: Historic Context from Southern Oregon University
Treaty with the Rogue River, 1853 from Oklahoma State University
Treaty with the Rogue River, 1854 from Oklahoma State University
1856 request to open Indian lands from the Native American Document Project
1857 request to open Indian lands from the Oregon State Archives

American Indian reservations in Oregon
Former American Indian reservations
Native American history of Oregon
1853 establishments in Oregon Territory
Rogue River Wars